Lucona was a ship sunk in the Indian Ocean on 23 January 1977 by a bomb planted by Austrian businessman Udo Proksch, as part of an insurance fraud. Proksch, the owner of the cargo, also then-owner of famous Viennese confectioners Demel, claimed 212 million schilling (approx. US$20 million) from his insurance company, saying that the cargo was expensive uranium mining equipment. He was subsequently convicted in 1991 of the murder of six crew (of the crew of 12) who were killed by the explosion, and died in prison. 

The Lucona was located by American shipwreck hunter David Mearns in January 1991; this was his first discovered very deep water wreck, at 4,200 metres (13,799 feet). Working as a Project Manager with Eastport International, he found that the ship had been sunk by a time bomb. While fraud had been suspected, investigations were obstructed by powerful Austrian politicians who were friends of Proksch.  Eventually, several ex-ministers were  convicted over their involvement. The ex-Minister of Foreign Affairs, Leopold Gratz, was sentenced for forging documents authenticating the cargo, and Finance Minister Hannes Androsch was dismissed for obstructing the investigations. The Minister of Defense Karl Lütgendorf, a shareholder in the Proksch firm, had given permission to deliver explosives to sabotage the ship and committed suicide when that became known.

Proksch fled to the Philippines in 1988 after Hans Pretterebner published a book about the scandal. Returning to Vienna incognito in 1989, he was recognized and arrested. He was sentenced to 20 years in prison on March 11, 1991. Walking out of the courtroom Proksch said "Heil Hitler!". A year later the sentence was increased to life in prison. He died on 27 June 2001 during heart surgery.

Works about the Lucona case
1988: Hans Pretterebner published a book about the Lucona case, Der Fall Lucona.
1993: , a film of the book about the Lucona, starring David Suchet; see IMDb entry.

See also
 Coffin ship (insurance)
 Gerald Freihofner

References

 
 
 

Maritime incidents in 1977
Ship bombings
Shipwrecks in the Indian Ocean